Florian Neuhold (born 6 July 1993) is an Austrian footballer who is currently a free agent.

Career
Neuhold joined the youth set-up of SK Sturm Graz from Grazer AK in August 2008, and having advanced through the club's youth system made his debut for the second team in a 4-0 win against ASK Voitsberg in Regional League Central on 2 October 2009. He made his first-team debut in a Champions League qualifier against FC Zestafoni of Georgia on 26 July 2011.

Neuhold made 10 further appearances in all competitions for Sturm in 2011/12, but new manager Peter Hyballa, who took over in June 2012, found Neuhold to be surplus to requirements and questioned his commitment in training. After a trial in England with Sheffield Wednesday, Neuhold joined SC Rheindorf Altach on loan in January 2013. At the end of the season, Altach took up their option to make Neuhold's move permanent.

On 30 June 2014, Neuhold left Altach to join LASK Linz before leaving the latter almost exactly a year later to join Admira Wacker on loan for the season. Admira also announced they have a right to purchase Neuhold permanently.

In September 2016, Neuhold joined the reserve side of German club Eintracht Braunschweig. In Summer 2017, he moved to Rot-Weiß Erfurt on a free transfer.

Neuhold has represented the Austria under-21s on eleven occasions, and he has also represented his country at a number of other youth levels.

References

1993 births
Living people
People from Graz-Umgebung District
Association football central defenders
Association football defenders
Austrian footballers
SK Sturm Graz players
SC Rheindorf Altach players
LASK players
FC Admira Wacker Mödling players
Eintracht Braunschweig II players
FC Rot-Weiß Erfurt players
Austria youth international footballers
Austria under-21 international footballers
Austrian Football Bundesliga players
3. Liga players
Regionalliga players
Austrian expatriate footballers
Expatriate footballers in Germany
Footballers from Styria